Carole Delga (born 19 August 1971) is a French politician of the Socialist Party (PS) who has been serving as the President of Occitania since 2016.

Political career
Delga has been a member of the Socialist Party since 2004.

Member of the National Assembly, 2012–2017
From 2012 until 2017, Delga was a member of the National Assembly, where she served on the Finance Committee (2012–2014) and the Defence Committee (2015–2017). In 2014, she briefly served as Secretary of State for Trade, Crafts, Consumer and Social Economy and Solidarity under Minister of Finance and Public Accounts Michel Sapin in the government of Prime Minister Manuel Valls; she replaced Valérie Fourneyron who had resigned for health reasons.

President of Occitanie, 2016–present
Ahead of the Socialist Party's 2017 primaries, Delga publicly endorsed Manuel Valls as the party's candidate for the presidential election later that year. Since 2017, she has been part of the party's leadership.

She was re-elected in the 2021 French regional elections.

Ahead of the 2022 presidential election, Delga endorsed Anne Hidalgo as the Socialist Party’s candidate.

References 

1971 births
Living people
Presidents of the Regional Council of Occitania (administrative region)
Members of the Regional Council of Occitania (administrative region)
Socialist Party (France) politicians
Politicians from Toulouse
Presidents of French regions and overseas collectivities
Women government ministers of France
Women mayors of places in France
21st-century French women politicians
Toulouse 1 University Capitole alumni